The Uli Hoeneß Cup was a pre-season association football match that took place on 24 July 2013 at the Allianz Arena in Munich, Germany. The competition featured hosts and 2012–13 UEFA Champions League winner Bayern Munich and the 2012–13 Spanish champions Barcelona. The game was the first that Bayern Munich's new manager Pep Guardiola contested against his former club Barcelona and was a late 60th birthday present for Bayern Munich club president Uli Hoeneß. The entire proceeds were donated towards social purposes. The original planned kick-off time (20:30) was changed because of the 2013 UEFA Women's Championship semi-final match between Sweden and Germany.

Participating teams

Match

Details

References

FC Bayern Munich matches
FC Barcelona matches
German football friendly trophies
2013–14 in German football
2013–14 in Spanish football